Actia nigroscutellata is a species of tachinid flies in the genus Actia of the family Tachinidae. It is native to Northern Europe, mostly Scandinavia, where it is rare.

References

nigroscutellata
Muscomorph flies of Europe
Insects described in 1927